Neomyro is a genus of South Pacific araneomorph spiders in the family Toxopidae, and was first described by Raymond Robert Forster & C. L. Wilton in 1973.  it contains only three species, all found in New Zealand: N. amplius, N. circe, and N. scitulus. Originally placed with the intertidal spiders, it was moved to the Toxopidae in 2017.

References

Araneomorphae genera
Spiders of New Zealand
Taxa named by Raymond Robert Forster
Toxopidae